The 2009 Judo Grand Prix Qingdao was held in Qingdao, China from 28 to 29 November 2009.

Medal summary

Men's events

Women's events

Source Results

Medal table

References

External links
 

2009 IJF World Tour
2009 Judo Grand Prix
Judo
Judo competitions in China
Judo
Judo